Long-distance cycling routes are designated cycling routes in various countries around the world for bicycle tourism.

See also
 Europe
 EuroVelo
 LF-routes of the Netherlands and Belgium
 National Cycle Network of Britain
 Swiss National Bike Routes
 United States
 United States Bicycle Route System
 East Coast Greenway
 Australia
 Munda Biddi Trail, the longest continuous off-road cycle trail of its kind in the world
 Bicentennial National Trail
 New Zealand
The Timber Trail, linear  trail crossing suspension bridges on the North Island, near Lake Taupo.
 Long-distance trail, the equivalent for hikers and other walkers

References

External links
 Top 10 long-distance cycle rides in Britain
 10 Long-Distance Bicycle Routes in the U.S.